Japanese Mongolian or Mongolian Japanese may refer to:
Japanese-Mongolian relations
Japanese people in Mongolia
Mongolians in Japan
Japanese language education in Mongolia
Mongolian language education in Japan
Multiracial people of Japanese and Mongolian descent